José Malleo (born 29 January 1944) is an Argentine former footballer who competed in the 1964 Summer Olympics.

References

1944 births
Association football midfielders
Argentine footballers
Footballers at the 1964 Summer Olympics
Living people
Olympic footballers of Argentina
Rosario Central footballers